Lazarus Jack is a graphic novel created by Mark Ricketts and Horacio Domingues and published in 2004 by Dark Horse Comics.

Synopsis
In 1926, magician Jackson "Lazarus Jack" Pierce accidentally causes his wife and three children to become trapped in an extradimensional void.  Seventy years later, a mysterious young man offers the aging magician the opportunity to restore his youth, and save his family.

References
Lazarus Jack at Dark Horse Comics official site

Dark Horse Comics titles